Patrik Anders Luxenburg (born 7 July 1972) is a Swedish former footballer. He made one Allsvenskan appearance for Djurgårdens IF.

Career

Club
In September 1990, Luxenburg made his Allsvenskan debut for Djurgårdens IF in a substitution in the 94th minute. Four seconds later, the referee ended the match and Luxenburg's Allsvenskan career ended with four seconds. He later played in Superettan for FC Café Opera.

International
Luxenburg was in the squad for 1991 FIFA World Youth Championship, but didn't make any appearances.

References

External links 
  (archive)

1972 births
Living people
Swedish footballers
Sweden youth international footballers
Allsvenskan players
Djurgårdens IF Fotboll players
Spånga IS players
AFC Eskilstuna players
Association football midfielders